The 1956 SMU Mustangs football team represented Southern Methodist University (SMU) as a member of the Southwest Conference (SWC) during the 1956 NCAA University Division football season. Led by Woody Woodard in his fourth and final season as head coach, the Mustangs compiled an overall record of 4–6 with a mark of 2–4 in conference play, placing fifth in the SWC. SMU played home games at the Cotton Bowl in Dallas. Bill Livingstone and Smitty Keller were the team captains.

Schedule

References

SMU
SMU Mustangs football seasons
SMU Mustangs football